Innis Records was a record label founded by musician Ike Turner in 1964. The label released singles from members within the Ike & Tina Turner Revue such as the Ikettes, and other acts Turner was producing. Turner hired George Grenier to handle his business affairs. The label was acquired by Pompeii Music Corp. in 1968.

Discography

See also 

 Pompeii Records
 Sonja Records
 Teena Records
 Sony Records
Prann Records
 List of record labels

References 

American record labels
Rhythm and blues record labels
Pop record labels
Ike Turner
Record labels established in 1963
Record labels disestablished in 1968
Vanity record labels
Record labels based in California
Defunct record labels of the United States